Mount Whymper may refer to:
 Mount Whymper (Edward), 2.844 m, mountain located on the Canadian Rocky Mountains, British Columbia, Canada, in the Vermilion Pass area, Kootenay National Park. Named for Edward Whymper.
 Mount Whymper (Frederick), 1,539 m, mountain located on Vancouver Island, British Columbia, Canada. Named for Frederick Whymper